The Caucasian moose, also known as the Caucasian elk (Alces alces caucasicus) is an extinct subspecies of moose found in the Caucasus Mountains of Eastern Europe and Asia Minor, in modern-day European Russia, Armenia, Azerbaijan, Georgia, and eastern Turkey.

Extinction
The subspecies was quite common until the mid-19th century, when populations began to decrease due to overhunting. It became extinct sometime in the beginning of the 20th century.

Predators
Among its predators were Asiatic lions, Persian leopards, Asiatic cheetahs, Eurasian brown bears, steppe wolves and the Caspian tiger. Eurasian lynxes may have preyed on calves.

See also
List of extinct animals of Europe
Caucasian wisent

References

External links
 Caucasian Moose – Extinct .

Mammal extinctions since 1500
Mammals of Turkey
Extinct mammals of Europe
Moose